John Leslie Steer (30 January 1919 – 10 October 1968) was an Australian politician.

He was born in Franklin. In 1950 he was elected to the Tasmanian House of Assembly as a Liberal member for Bass. He resigned from the House in 1961 to contest the Legislative Council seat of Cornwall, but he was unsuccessful. Returning to the House in 1964, he died in office in 1968.

References

1919 births
1968 deaths
Liberal Party of Australia members of the Parliament of Tasmania
Members of the Tasmanian House of Assembly
20th-century Australian politicians